The Fort of Leça da Palmeira, or alternately the Castle of Matosinhos is a 17th-century fort located in civil parish of Leça da Palmeira, municipality of Matosinhos in the Greater Porto region of Portugal.

History 

The fort was begun in 1638 in the area known as Santa Catarina by João Sá e Meneses, then Count of Penaguião, which they initially designated as the Forte de Nossa Senhora das Neves da Barra de Leça (Fort of Our Layd of the Snows of the Leça Sandbar). The objective of this fortification was to reinforce the sandbar of the mouth of the Douro, in conjunction with the Fort of São Francisco Xavier do Queijo, and the Fort of São João da Foz.

With the beginning of the Portuguese Restoration War in 1640, the conclusion of the project took on a greater importance. But, by 1642, the fort was not yet completed, such that officials of the municipal council of Porto petitioned King John IV to force the quick conclusion of the public works. The construction only continued in 1646, and two years later the first garrison of six soldiers was instituted by royal order. But, the establishment of the garrison did not mean the construction was concluded. In 1655, a new petition was sent to the King, yet the construction would drag onto the next century.

In 1701, the fort, still uncompleted, was home for a larger group of soldiers, artillery emplacements and four cannons. It was only in 1720 that the fort was finally completed.

During the Liberal Wars, around 1832, the fort had suffered some damage, and reconstruction were completed in the warehouses, the drawbridge, internal staircase and the parapets. A few years later, the fort lost its military function, with the removal of the garrison, and in 1844 the main square became the location of the customs house of Porto.

In the 20th century, the fort was transferred to the Captaincy of the Port of Leixões, where they installed their services.

In 1962, a landscaping project was completed by Ilídio de Araújo, who beautified the grounds and area around the fort.

Architecture 
The fort is located along the urban shoreline of the civil parish of Leça da Palmeira, implanted in front of the Port of Leixões, and encircled by homes and residences.

The fort is a typical design in the form of a star pattern, with four points, protected by angular curtain wall and barbicans. The fort still has some cannons along its battlements. Apart from a few dependencies associated with its service as fortification, the rest of the interior is occupied by constructions uncharacteristic of this service, constructed to service the Captaincy of the Porto Leixões, including aerials, communications antennas and service buildings.

References 
 Citations

 Sources
 
 
 
 
 

Leca da Palmeira
Buildings and structures in Porto District
Matosinhos
Coastal fortifications in Portugal